Bob Baker Memorial Airport  is a public airport located one mile (2 km) north of the central business district of Kiana, a city in the Northwest Arctic Borough of the U.S. state of Alaska. The airport is owned by the state.

Facilities 
Bob Baker Memorial Airport has one gravel surfaced runway (6/24) measuring 3,400 x 100 ft. (1,036 x 30 m).

Airlines and destinations

References

External links 
 FAA Alaska airport diagram (GIF)
 Resources for this airport:
 
 
 

Airports in Northwest Arctic Borough, Alaska
Airports in the Arctic